Matthew Higginbottom (born 20 October 1990) is an English cricketer. Higginbottom is a left-handed batsman who bowls right-arm medium-fast. He was born at Stockport, Greater Manchester.

Higginbottom was educated at New Mills School Business & Enterprise College, before studying Sport and Business Management at Leeds Metropolitan University. While attending the university, he was selected to play for Leeds/Bradford MCCU, making his first-class debut in the team's inaugural first-class match against Surrey at The Oval in 2012. He made a second first-class appearance for the team in that same season against Yorkshire at Headingley. He signed a summer–long contract with Derbyshire for the 2012 season.

References

External links
Matt Higginbottom at ESPNcricinfo
Matt Higginbottom at CricketArchive

1990 births
Living people
Sportspeople from Stockport
Alumni of Leeds Beckett University
English cricketers
Leeds/Bradford MCCU cricketers
Derbyshire cricketers
Shropshire cricketers